Transport in Slovakia is possible by rail, road, air or rivers. Slovakia is a developed Central European country with a well-developed rail network (3,662 km) and a highway system (854 km). The main international airport is the M. R. Štefánik Airport in the capital, Bratislava. The most important waterway is the river Danube used both by passenger, cargo and freight ships. The two most important harbours in Slovakia is Komarno harbour and Bratislava harbour.

Railways 

 total: 3,662 km (2008)
 broad gauge: 99 km of  gauge - used for freight transport only, see Uzhhorod - Košice broad gauge track
 standard gauge: 3,473 km of  gauge (1,588 km electrified; 1,011 km double track)
 narrow gauge: 50 km (45 km of  gauge; 5 km of  gauge)

Slovakia has a range of railway connections, connecting all of Slovakia and the rest of Europe. There are lots of railway operators on there railway with the main one being ZSSK. The railway network is very dense in the western and eastern part of Slovakia. The one high speed rail line in Slovakia is the Rychlik between Bratislava and Kosice (Via Zillina). The Rychlik was established in 2002 after ZSSK took over ZSR.

Passenger train operators 

 ZSSK Rychlik - High speed rail passenger trains
 ZSSK REX - Regional express trains
 Leo express - Inter city railway
 Regio jet - Inter city trains
 Railjet - High speed rail passenger trains operated by the OBB

Cargo train operators 
The main cargo train operator is ZSSK cargo for cargo freight rail in Slovakia.

Rail links with adjacent countries 

 Czech republic
 Austria
 Poland
 Hungary
 Ukraine

Roads 

 total: 43,761 km
 paved: 38,085 km (including 384 km of expressways)
 unpaved: 5,676 km 
(2018)

Slovakia has a total of 43,761 km of roads in their country with 3,594 km being main or national road with 13,969 km being secondary and regional roads and  being highways and the rest are other roads.

Highways 

 Motorways in Slovakia  (2022)
 D1: Bratislava - Trnava - Trenčín - Považská Bystrica - Žilina, Liptovský Mikuláš - Jánovce, Prešov - Košice - Záhor(SK/UA border)
 D2: Kúty (CZ/SK border) - Malacky - Bratislava - Jarovce (SK/H border)
 D3: Dolný Hričov - Žilina - Čadca - Skalité(SK/PL border)
 D4: Jarovce - (SK/A border)

 Expressways in Slovakia 
 R1: Trnava - Nitra - Zvolen - Banská Bystrica
 R2: (SK/CZ border) - Trenčín - Prievidza - Zvolen - Rimavská Sobota - Košice
 R3: (SK/H border) - Zvolen - Martin - (SK/PL border)
 R4: (SK/H border) - Košice - Prešov - Svidník - (SK/PL border)
 R5: Svrčinovec - (SK/CZ border)R6: Beluša - Púchov - (SK/CZ border)
 R7: Bratislava - Nové Zámky - Krupina - Lučenec

Waterways 
 172 km on the Danube used both by passenger, cargo and freight ships of nearly all sizes.

Pipelines 
 petroleum products 416 km; natural gas 6,769 km (2010)
 gas pipelines 162 km
 Crude oil 19 km

Ports and harbors 
 Port of Bratislava
 Port of Komárno

Airports 
See:List of airports in Slovakia

total: 37 
(2012)

Airports with paved runways 

(2012)

Airports with unpaved runways 
total: 18
 914 to 1,523 m: 10
 under 914 m: 8 
(2002)

Heliports 
total: 5
(2022)

Municipal transport

Bus and trolleybus 

Most towns and cities in Slovakia have well developed bus networks. Most of the busses are operated by the city or town council but most regional buses are operated by private operators with the permission of local authorities or the county council. There's as well a trolleybus system which only operates in large cities and are operated by the town council. They are a much more of an ecological system of transport then a standard bus

Tram 

 
Trams are only found in Bratislava and Kosice. The first tram to arrive in Slovakia was in 1895 in Bratislava and then later on in 1913 trams arrived in Kosice.Today the tram network is expanding rapidly in both cities.

See also 
 Rail transport in Slovakia
 Slovakia
 Highways in Slovakia
 List of airports in Slovakia

References

External links 
Highways in Slovakia